Kristof Snelders is a Belgian professional retired football player. He was usually fielded as a striker, although also able to play as right winger.

Career
In the beginning of July 2007, Snelders was signed by Cercle Brugge due to a relegation release clause in his contract with his former team Lierse, where he was voted Player of the Season by the fans.

Due to hard competition with De Smet, De Sutter, Iachtchouk and Gombami for a place in Cercle's attack, Snelders has become a super sub, scoring relatively frequently compared to his minutes played.

After a disappointing 2008-09 season, Snelders decided to watch out for a new team. SV Roeselare and KV Kortrijk were said to be interested. Eventually, he chose to sign for SK Beveren, thus rejecting an offer from RS Waasland. However Beveren and Waasland merged in 2010 and Snelders stayed with the fusion team Waasland-Beveren until the summer of 2012, when he moved to Cappellen. After one season at Cappellen, Snelders chose to retire from professional football at the age of 30.

References

External links
 Kristof Snelders player info at the official Cercle Brugge site 
 

Living people
1982 births
Belgian footballers
Cercle Brugge K.S.V. players
Association football forwards
K.A.A. Gent players
Feyenoord players
Beerschot A.C. players
R.W.D.M. Brussels F.C. players
Lierse S.K. players
Belgian Pro League players
Challenger Pro League players
K.S.K. Beveren players
S.K. Beveren players
Royal Cappellen F.C. players
Footballers from Antwerp